The discography of American country artist Wynn Stewart contains 11 studio albums, nine compilation albums, 50 singles and one charting B-side single. Stewart signed his first recording contract in 1954, releasing his debut single, "I've Waited a Lifetime." He then briefly signed with Capitol Records, where he had his first charting single with "Waltz of the Angels." The song was a major hit, reaching number 14 on the Billboard Hot Country and Western Sides chart in 1956. His follow-up singles to the hit were not a commercial success and Stewart left Capitol. Stewart then signed with Challenge Records where he adapted a new country style. In 1959, his single "Wishful Thinking" became a major hit. The song was his first to reach the top ten on the country chart, peaking at number five in March 1960. Also in 1960, his duet with Jan Howard became a minor charting single. By December 1961, "Big, Big Love" became his third major hit, climbing to number 18 on the Billboard country chart.

Stewart encountered some professional setbacks and signed back with his former label, Capitol Records in 1965. In 1967, the single "It's Such a Pretty World Today" became the biggest his of his career. In June 1967, the song reached number one on the Billboard Hot Country Singles chart and spent two weeks there. His second studio album of the same name reached number one on the Billboard Top Country Albums chart in 1967 as well. His musical style shifted again following its success and he went towards a softer Nashville Sound style. Stewart's three follow-up singles all reached the top ten of the country chart: "'Cause I Have You," "Love's Gonna Happen to Me" and "Something Pretty." He also continued to release studio albums. His third album release, Love's Gonna Happen to Me (1967), reached number 13 on the country albums chart. This was followed by Something Pretty (1968), which reached number 28 on the same chart.

Stewart left Capitol in 1971 and moved to RCA Records. He recorded several singles, which only reached minor positions on the Billboard country songs chart. Singles such as "It's Raining in Seattle," only reached the top 60 of the country chart. In 1975, he signed with Playboy Records. In 1976, his single "After the Storm" became a major hit. In October 1976, the single reached number eight on the Billboard country songs chart, becoming his first top ten hit in nearly a decade. Its follow-up single, "Sing a Sad Song," reached the top 20 in 1977. In the late 1970s, Stewart established his own recording label where he released two singles. The first, "Eyes as Big as Dallas," reached the top 40 of the country songs chart. He continued releasing music sporadically before his death in 1985. Posthumously, his final charting single was released called "Wait Till I Get My Hands on You." The song reached number 98 on the Billboard country chart in 1985.

Albums

Studio albums

Compilation albums

Singles

As lead artist

As a collaborative artist

Other charted songs

Notes

References

External links
 Wynn Stewart full discography at Discogs

Country music discographies
Discographies of American artists

Official website
http://www.wynnstewart.com/